Yangel Clemente Herrera Ravelo (born 7 January 1998) is a Venezuelan professional footballer who plays as a defensive midfielder for Spanish club Girona, on loan from English club Manchester City, and the Venezuela national team.

Club career
Herrera started his club career at Monagas SC before moving to Atlético Venezuela in 2016.

Manchester City

Loan to New York City
On 31 January 2017 it was confirmed that Herrera had signed for Manchester City. Herrera was immediately sent to New York City on a two-year loan. He made his debut on 12 March, as a substitute in a 4–0 win over D.C. United.

Loan to Huesca
Following the conclusion of his two-year stay at New York City, Herrera was loaned to La Liga side Huesca for the last six months of the 2018–19 season.

Loan to Granada
On 26 July 2019, Herrera was loaned to Granada for the 2019–20 season. On 30 August 2020, his loan was extended for the 2020–21 season.

Loan to Espanyol
On 31 August 2021, Herrera moved to fellow La Liga side Espanyol on a one-year loan deal.

Loan to Girona 
On 2 August 2022, Herrera joined newly promoted side Girona, on a season-long loan.

International career

Herrera made his international debut for the Venezuela national team on 10 October 2016, coming on as a substitute in a 2–0 loss to Brazil.

Herrera was named captain of the Venezuela U20 team for the 2017 U-20 World Cup. He scored the only goal, in the 108th minute of their Round of 16 win over Japan.

Career statistics

Club

International

Scores and results list Venezuela's goal tally first, score column indicates score after each Herrera goal.

Honours
Monagas
Venezuelan Segunda División: 2015

Venezuela U20
FIFA U-20 World Cup runner-up: 2017
South American Youth Football Championship Third place: 2017

Individual
FIFA U-20 World Cup Bronze Ball: 2017

References

External links

 
 
 

1998 births
Living people
Association football midfielders
Venezuelan Primera División players
Major League Soccer players
La Liga players
Manchester City F.C. players
New York City FC players
SD Huesca footballers
Granada CF footballers
RCD Espanyol footballers
Girona FC players
Expatriate soccer players in the United States
Expatriate footballers in Spain
People from La Guaira
Venezuela international footballers
Venezuela under-20 international footballers
Venezuela youth international footballers
Venezuelan expatriate footballers
Venezuelan expatriate sportspeople in Spain
Venezuelan expatriate sportspeople in the United States
Venezuelan footballers
2019 Copa América players
2021 Copa América players